Carlos Miller may refer to:

Carlos Miller, creator of the website Photography Is Not a Crime
Carlos O. Miller, scientist who isolated kinetin

See also
Karlous Miller, American comedian